Hypena colombana, is a moth of the family Erebidae first described by Frederic Moore in 1855. It is found in Sri Lanka.

References

Moths of Asia
Moths described in 1885
colombana